Heavy Tango is a studio album by Argentine singer and actress Nacha Guevara, released in 1991 by BMG and RCA Records. Recorded between April and August 1991 in Buenos Aires, it is her only musical work published during the 1990s. As its title indicates, the album tries to be a fusion of tango with heavy metal, inspired by glam metal band Bon Jovi's work of the late 1980s. Guevara co-produced and led the project with her partner at the time, Miguel Ronsini (under his stage name Mike Ron Sini), a relationship that scandalized the public opinion of the time, as she was much older than him. The album features Tita Merello on her last recording appearance, a hip hop version of the famous tango "Se dice de mí". During this era, the singer adopted a look very reminiscent of Cher's. The Heavy Tango Tour toured the Argentine cities of Buenos Aires, Córdoba and Rosario. In addition to Argentina, Guevara performed in Málaga, at the Gran Teatro of Huelva, and at the Seville Expo '92. While in Spain, the singer also made several appearances on Jesús Quintero's television program.

The album was universally panned by the press, and is considered Guevara's most questioned work. She was accused of "ruining tango and rock simultaneously", and the album was described as a "grotesque recklessness", a "strange monstrosity of genres", and a display of bad taste. In a 2003 interview, singer Raúl Lavié said: "Was [Heavy Tango] another assassination attempt on the tango? She totally killed it." Even so, some people have somewhat recognized Heavy Tango as a pioneering work of "tango fusion", years before electronic tango appeared. In a 2018 interview, Guevara said of the album: "Everyone did it later! The most reactionary in terms of reception were the rock fans, not the tango fans."

Track listing

Personnel
Credits adapted from Heavy Tango's liner notes. 

Nacha Guevara production, idea and art design
Mike Ron Siniarrangements, musical direction, production, idea and art design
Anel Pazarrangements, musical direction, production and MIDI programming
Mario Breuersound engineer
Guido Nissensonassistant engineer
Luciano Rodofiliexecutive producer
Maximiliano Gilbertproduction assistant
Lino Patalanogeneral production
Bernie Grundmanmastering
Pablo Aguilarmastering supervision
Guillermo Monteleonephotography
José Luis Servioliart direction
Claudio Aboyillustrator

See also

 1991 in music
 History of the tango
 List of music considered the worst

References

External links
 
 Heavy Tango statistics, tagging and previews at Last.fm
 Heavy Tango at Rate Your Music

1991 albums
Tango albums
Rock albums by Argentine artists